Cullercoats is a coastal settlement in the metropolitan borough of North Tyneside, Tyne and Wear, North East England. Historically in Northumberland, it has now been absorbed into the wider Tyneside conurbation, sitting between Tynemouth to the south and Whitley Bay to the north. The population of this North Tyneside ward at the 2011 census was 9,202.

There is a semi-circular sandy beach with cliffs and six caves, and the village is a popular destination for day-trippers. It also acts as an attractive dormitory town for nearby Newcastle upon Tyne. The name is thought to derive from dove (or "culver") cotes.

History and architecture

Cullercoats village was founded in 1539. Historically the village depended on fishing; there was also local coal mining in so-called bell pits. The coal was used to fire salt pans (now long gone) on the field now known as the boat field. As a port, Cullercoats was used to export both salt and coal from the 1670s. A new harbour and pier were constructed in 1682 and a waggonway that brought coal to the village from inland workings was added in 1690. These innovations resulted in a flourishing trade. However the salt industry declined and the growth of the railways led to coal shipments being relocated to better harbours. By 1710 the pier had been severely damaged and the condition of the waggonway had deteriorated. In 1724 the Whitley and Cullercoats colleries were closed. The last salt pans moved to Blyth in 1726.  This left fishing as the main industry and two piers were built on either side of the harbour in the 19th century to provide shelter for the many open top fishing vessels, or cobles, launched from the harbour. In 1801 the population of the village was 452.

The harbour is the home of the Dove Marine Laboratory of 1897, a research and teaching laboratory which forms part of the School of Marine Science and Technology within Newcastle University.

In 1848, a coble taking a pilot to a ship further out at sea capsized with the loss of all on board. In response to this disaster the local landowner, the Duke of Northumberland funded the setting up of an RNLI lifeboat station. The following year a second disaster, this time costing 20 lifeboat crew their lives, prompted the Duke to sponsor a competition to design a self-righting lifeboat. The resulting boat, the Percy was built at the Duke's expense and delivered to Cullercoats in 1852. The Brigade House and watchtower were designed by Newcastle upon Tyne-based architect Frank West Rich in 1877–79, but the lifeboat station remained in use, with a few minor alterations, until 2003 when a new station was opened. In 2022, Cullercoats had its first all female lifeboat crew.

The Bay Hotel, an important local landmark, was demolished in 2004. It was notable for a period in the 1880s when it was home to the American watercolour artist Winslow Homer who stayed in room 17 of the Hudleston Arms (1870) (later called the Bay Hotel), and maintained a studio across the road at No.12 Bank Top (demolished 1930). Homer was a resident in Cullercoats from April 1881 to November 1882. An apartment block, named Winslow Court, has been built on the site of the Bay Hotel (2007).

Homer was the most famous of the professional artists who were part of  the "Cullercoats Colony" in the period 1870–1920. Others included Henry H. Emmerson, Robert Jobling, Arthur H. Marsh, Isa Thompson, John Falconer Slater and John Charlton and visitors like Ralph Hedley.

Cullercoats is interesting from an architectural perspective: on Simpson Street there is a row of fishermen's cottages which were preserved during the redevelopment of the village in the 1970s. Between the coast and the railway (now Metro) line are Victorian terraces. The land immediately on the other side consists of long avenues of semi-detached houses built between the wars. Another change can be seen along the line of Broadway where the housing changes again to mixed semi-detached/detached 1970s and 1980s housing estates built around long winding roads and cul-de-sacs. Also of note is St George's Parish Church as a good example of Gothic revival architecture.

The present railway station was first opened by the North Eastern Railway in 1882, and the original station buildings are still in use, now served by the Tyne and Wear Metro.

Cullercoats Fish Lass

William Finden noted that the fishwives (wives and daughters of the fishermen) searched for the bait, digging sand-worms, gathering mussels or seeking limpets and dog-crabs. They also assisted in baiting the hooks. In addition to this, they carried the fish to the market to sell them. "When fish are scarce, they not unfrequently carried a load on their shoulders, weighing between three or four stone, to Newcastle, which is about ten miles distant from Cullercoats, in the hope of meeting with a better market."

The Cullercoats Fish Lass became a popular subject for many of the Cullercoats Artist Colony, most notably Winslow Homer. While he resided from the spring of 1881 to November 1882, Homer became sensitive to the strenuous and courageous lives of its inhabitants, particularly the women, whom he depicted many times, hauling and cleaning fish, mending nets, and, most poignantly, standing at the water's edge, awaiting the return of their men.

Jean F. Terry wrote, in 1913, "The Cullercoats fishwife, with her cheerful weather-bronzed face, her short jacket and ample skirts of blue flannel, and her heavily laden "creel" of fish is not only appreciated by the brotherhood of brush and pencil, but is one of the notable sights of the district".

William S Garson, in his 1935 book, The Romance of Old Tynemouth and Cullercoats, wrote: "The Cullercoats fishwife plays a man's part in helping to launch the lifeboat, frequently wading waist-high into furious and ice-cold waters, and she never hesitates to allow her man to take a place on the boat, though he may go to face death and disaster."

North Tyneside based film company, ACT 2 CAM, made a film in 2013 about the life of a young fishwife, entitled The Cullercoats Fishlass. The story follows the fortunes of a young fishwife living at the turn of the 20th century. Over 150 young people aged 8–18 were engaged in the creation of the film, working on screen and behind the camera.

Popular culture

Edward Corvan wrote and performed a popular music hall song, "The Cullercoats Fish Lass", in 1862:

Aw's a Cullercoats fish-lass, se cozy an' free
Browt up in a cottage close on by the sea;
An' aw sell fine fresh fish ti poor an' ti rich--
Will ye buy, will ye buy, will ye buy maw fresh fish?

Local English schoolmaster, musician and songwriter John Gair "Jack" Robson, wrote the song Cullercoats Bay. Copyrighted in 1950, and performed by Owen Brannigan/Gerald Moore in 1960, the lyrics sing the praises of the town, claiming:

In many strange lands o'er the ocean I've been,
And countless the beautiful sights I have seen,
But I'm a Tynesider, and proudly must say,
I've seen nothing finer than Cullercoats Bay.
The song "Tunnel of Love" by the British rock band Dire Straits, which was included on their 1980 album Making Movies, mentions Cullercoats.

Elinor Brent-Dyer's novel for adults, Jean of Storms, originally serialised in the Shields Gazette in 1930, is set in a fictionalised Cullercoats called Hasnett.

Notable residents

Chas Chandler – bass guitarist with the Animals and manager of Jimi Hendrix
Percy Dawson - footballer
Winslow Homer – American painter
Carol Malia – BBC Look North presenter
George Relph - actor
Christian Rodska – actor
Andy Taylor – musician with Duran Duran.
Ross Welford - children's author.

Cullercoats Life Brigade House

The Watch House is a notable building, built in 1879 for the use of the Cullercoats Volunteer Life Brigade. It is grade II listed.

Cullercoats NAVTEX transmissions
Cullercoats is the base from which NAVTEX transmissions for the western North Sea area are broadcast. For the purpose of extended Shipping Forecasts, the Met Office uses Cullercoats as the name of the forecast area covering the North Sea between Fair Isle and Dover.

References

External links
Cullercoats Lifeboat
Cullercoats
Cullercoats Community Centre 

Populated coastal places in Tyne and Wear
Fishing communities
Metropolitan Borough of North Tyneside